Singongdeok station was a railway station on the Gyeongchun Line.

Defunct railway stations in South Korea